Alexandre Sowa (8 April 1927 – 21 June 2017) was a French racing cyclist. He rode in the 1952 Tour de France.

References

1927 births
2017 deaths
French male cyclists
Place of birth missing